Total War: Three Kingdoms is a turn-based strategy real-time tactics video game developed by Creative Assembly and published by Sega. As the 12th mainline entry (the 13th entry) in the Total War series, the game was released for Windows on May 23, 2019. Feral Interactive released a Linux and macOS version of the game on the same day.

Gameplay
Like its predecessors, Total War: Three Kingdoms is a turn-based strategy real-time tactics game. Set in the Three Kingdoms period (220–280), players control one of the game's twelve factions, who must eliminate other factions, unify China and become its ultimate ruler. These factions are led by warlords, such as Cao Cao, Liu Bei, and Sun Quan. In siege battles, players command both infantry and cavalry units. All the units featured in the game are divided into different retinues, with each led by a powerful general. The player can deploy up to three generals into the battlefield at once along with three in reserve, and players will only have access to the units that said generals can recruit.

The player wins a siege battle when all hostile generals are killed or the central point of the city is captured. These generals, which can be commanded separately from their troops, have the possession of unique ancillaries, which can be looted once they are killed. For instance, Lü Bu's Red Hare can be captured and used by other generals. Generals can engage in a one-versus-one dueling, which ends when one of them dies or flees. Each general has different classes and specialties, granting their units with both active and passive buffs. The team introduces the concept of "guanxi" to the game, in which each general will form social connections and relationships with other characters. Viewing concepts like "obligations, reciprocity, and trust" as important virtues, these generals have unique personalities and desires that players need to cater to. If their demands are not met, their happiness rating will drop and this may lead to various repercussions for players. Unlike previous Total War games in which characters seldom interact with each other, the generals featured in the game are actively forming relationships with the characters they meet throughout the campaign. This adds a strategic layer to the game in which players need to understand these generals before making any decisions.

The game features two game modes. The first mode, "Romance", is based on the novel Romance of the Three Kingdoms, in which generals are gifted with nearly superhuman strength. Another mode, "Records", based on Records of the Three Kingdoms, presents a more historically authentic version. In Records, the generals have their powers removed and they can no longer be commanded separately, in addition to changing certain equipment in-game to be more historically authentic.

Plot

The game begins in 190 AD, in which the once glorious Han dynasty is on the verge of collapse. The new emperor, Emperor Xian, enthroned at the age of eight, was manipulated by the warlord Dong Zhuo, whose oppressive rule leads to chaos. New warlords rise and form alliances to start the campaign against Dong Zhuo. With each warlord having personal ambitions and allegiances constantly shifting, the champions that emerge from the ever lasting wars will shape the future of China.

Development and release

The game was developed by Creative Assembly. Creative Assembly had refined many elements of the game, bringing changes to both the artificial intelligence and the user interface. The team introduced the system of "guanxi" in order to make the characters and generals more important in the game, as Records and Romances, two of the team's most prominent source materials, have a huge focus on characters. The sinologist Rafe de Crespigny, an expert on the period, acted as a consultant for the game.

When the game was still in preproduction in November 2016, Creative Assembly announced that the next historical Total War title would explore a new era instead of being a sequel to any previous game. Three Kingdoms was revealed by publisher Sega on January 11, 2018 with a cinematic trailer. Originally set to be released in the second half of 2018, the game was delayed to early 2019 so that the team had additional development time to complete the game's production. Later on, a new release date of March 7, 2019 was announced, which was then delayed to May 23, 2019.

Downloadable content
Several pieces of downloadable content have been released, including the following:

Reception

Critical reception

Total War: Three Kingdoms received positive reviews from critics, with many specifically praising the character-driven gameplay mechanics and storytelling elements. Chris Wray of wccftech describes the game is "as close to flawless, with a fantastic balance of 4X strategy and character-focused development and emergent storytelling." IGN's TJ Hafer stated that Three Kingdoms should serve as the example for all games of its genre going forward. Edwin Evans-Thirlwell of The Guardian stated the game "...is a wonderfully torrid period epic that understands the greatest stories are written about people, not empires." Jody Macgregor of PC Gamer praised the campaign elements, but found the game still couldn't break off from longstanding problems the series has always faced, claiming Three Kingdoms "is not the best Total War game but not the worst by a long shot."

The Romance mode has also been praised as bringing fascinating additions to the game, with many reviewers comparing it to Total War: Warhammer. Preston Dozsa of CGMagazine stated the game "represents the best of both the historical and fantasy sides of the franchise." Sean Martin from Hooked Gamers stated the game "is the most divergent Total War I’ve seen since Total War: Warhammer... taking what is good in fantasy and using it to complement the historical components of the game." Denis Ryan of Rock, Paper, Shotgun stated the game draws inspiration from many games that Creative Assembly created in the past, and "despite the resemblance there really is no game which has quite the same combination of elements, nor is there any strategy game that looks this good."

Chris Tapsell of Eurogamer also stated the game is "ambitious and sometimes overwhelming." PCGamesN's Phil Iwaniuk states the game brings issues along with innovations, noted that despite the game offers a memorable campaign, the real-time battles portion lacks depth compared to rest of the series.

Sales
According to the developer Creative Assembly, Total War: Three Kingdoms was the most pre-ordered Total War game until its release date. The game also set the record of concurrent players for Total War series, with over 160,000 people playing simultaneously on the day of release and reaching 192,000 by the first weekend, making it the biggest concurrent played strategy game on Steam. The game became the fastest-selling game in the history of the franchise, selling one million copies in a week since its initial release.

Awards

References

Official website
 

2019 video games
Creative Assembly games
Multiplayer and single-player video games
Real-time tactics video games
Sega video games
Total War (video game series)
Turn-based strategy video games
Video games developed in the United Kingdom
Video games set in the Three Kingdoms
Video games based on Romance of the Three Kingdoms
Windows games
MacOS games
Linux games
Historical simulation games
Grand strategy video games
Video games based on Chinese mythology
Feral Interactive games